The Battle of Kadesh or Battle of Qadesh took place between the forces of the New Kingdom of Egypt under Ramesses II and the Hittite Empire under Muwatalli II at the city of Kadesh on the Orontes River, just upstream of Lake Homs near the modern Lebanon–Syria border.

The battle is generally dated to 1274 BC from the Egyptian chronology, and is the earliest pitched battle in recorded history for which details of tactics and formations are known. It is believed to have been the largest chariot battle ever fought, involving between 5,000 and 6,000 chariots in total.

As a result of discovery of multiple Kadesh inscriptions and the Egyptian–Hittite peace treaty, it is the best documented battle in all of ancient history.

Background
After expelling the Hyksos' 15th Dynasty around 1550 BC, the Egyptian New Kingdom rulers became more aggressive in reclaiming control of their state's borders. Thutmose I, Thutmose III and his son and coregent Amenhotep II fought battles from Megiddo north to the Orontes River, including conflict with Kadesh.

Many of the Egyptian campaign accounts between c. 1400 and 1300 BC reflect the general destabilization of the Djahy region (southern Canaan). The reigns of Thutmose IV and Amenhotep III were undistinguished, except that Egypt continued to lose territory to the Mitanni in northern Syria.

During the late Eighteenth Dynasty, the Amarna letters tell the story of the decline of Egyptian influence in the region. The Egyptians showed flagging interest here until almost the end of the dynasty. Horemheb (d. 1292 BC), the last ruler of this dynasty, campaigned in this region, finally beginning to turn Egyptian interest back to the area.

This process continued in the Nineteenth Dynasty. Like his father Ramesses I, Seti I was a military commander who set out to restore Egypt's empire to the days of the Tuthmosid kings almost a century before. Inscriptions on the Karnak walls record the details of his campaigns into Canaan and ancient Syria. He took 20,000 men and reoccupied abandoned Egyptian posts and garrisoned cities. He made an informal peace with the Hittites, took control of coastal areas along the Mediterranean Sea and continued to campaign in Canaan. A second campaign led to his capture of Kadesh (where a stela commemorated his victory) and the Amurru kingdom. His son and heir Ramesses II campaigned with him. There are historical records that record a large weapons order by Ramesses II in the year before the expedition he led to Kadesh in his fifth regnal year.

However, at some point both regions may have lapsed back under Hittite control. What exactly happened to Amurru is disputed. Hittitologist Trevor R. Bryce suggests that although it may have fallen once again under Hittite control, it is more likely Amurru remained a Hittite vassal state.

The immediate antecedents to the Battle of Kadesh were the early campaigns of Ramesses II into Canaan. In the fourth year of his reign, he marched north into Syria, either to recapture Amurru or, as a probing effort, to confirm his vassals' loyalty and explore the terrain of possible battles. In the spring of the fifth year of his reign, in May 1274 BC, Ramesses II launched a campaign from his capital Pi-Ramesses (modern Qantir). The army moved beyond the fortress of Tjel and along the coast leading to Gaza.

The recovery of Amurru was Muwatalli II's stated motivation for marching south to confront the Egyptians.

Contending forces

Ramesses led an army of four divisions: Amun, Re (pRe), Set, and the apparently newly-formed Ptah division.

There was also a poorly documented troop called the nrrn (Ne'arin or Nearin), possibly Canaanite military mercenaries with Egyptian allegiance or even Egyptians, that Ramesses II had left in Amurru, apparently in order to secure the port of Sumur. This division would come to play a critical role in the battle. Also significant was the presence of Sherden troops within the Egyptian army. This is the first time they appear as Egyptian mercenaries, and they would play an increasingly significant role in Late Bronze Age history, ultimately appearing among the Sea Peoples that ravaged the east Mediterranean at the end of the Bronze Age. Healy in Armies of the Pharaohs observes:

On the Hittite side, King Muwatalli II had mustered several of his allies, among them Rimisharrinaa, the king of Aleppo.  Ramesses II recorded a long list of 19 Hittite allies brought to Kadesh by Muwatalli. This list is of considerable interest to Hittitologists, as it reflects the extent of Hittite influence at the time.

Battle

Muwatalli had positioned his troops behind "Old Kadesh", but Ramesses was misled by two spies whom the Egyptians had captured to think that the Hittite forces were still far off, at Aleppo, and ordered his forces to set up camp. The false intelligence caused Ramesses to march hastily towards Kadesh, where the Egyptians were caught off-guard.

Ramesses II describes his arrival on the battlefield in the two principal inscriptions that he wrote concerning the battle, which were the so-called "Poem" and the "Bulletin":

As Ramesses and the Egyptian advance guard were about 11 kilometers from Kadesh, south of Shabtuna, he met two Shasu nomads who told him that the Hittite king was "in the land of Aleppo, on the north of Tunip" 200 kilometers away, where, the Shasu said, he was "(too much) afraid of Pharaoh, L.P.H., to come south".<ref
 name="Wilson">Wilson, John A, "The Texts of the Battle of Kadesh", The American Journal of Semitic Languages and Literatures, Vol. 34, no. 4, July 1927, p. 278.</ref> This was, state the Egyptian texts, a false report ordered by the Hittites "with the aim of preventing the army of His Majesty from drawing up to combat with the foe of Hatti". An Egyptian scout then arrived at the camp bringing two Hittite prisoners. The prisoners revealed that the entire Hittite army and the Hittite king were actually close at hand:

After this, Ramesses II called his princes to meet with him and discuss the fault of his governors and officials in not informing the position of Muwatalli II and his army. As Ramesses was alone with his bodyguard and the Amun division, the vizier was ordered to hasten the arrival of the Ptah and Seth divisions, with the Re division having almost arrived at the camp. While Ramesses was talking with the princes and ordering the Amun division to prepare for battle, the Hittite chariots crossed the river and charged the middle of the Ra division as they were making their way toward Ramesses' position. The Ra division was caught in the open and scattered in all directions. Some fled northward to the Amun camp, all the while being pursued by Hittite chariots.

The Hittite chariotry then rounded north and attacked the Egyptian camp, crashing through the Amun shield wall and creating panic among the Amun division. However, the momentum of the Hittite attack was already starting to wane, as the impending obstacles of such a large camp forced many Hittite charioteers to slow their attack; some were killed in chariot crashes. In the Egyptian account of the battle, Ramesses describes himself as being deserted and surrounded by enemies: "No officer was with me, no charioteer, no soldier of the army, no shield-bearer[.]"

Ramesses was able to defeat his initial attackers and to return to the Egyptian lines: "I was before them like Set in his moment. I found the mass of chariots in whose midst I was, scattering them before my horses[.]" The pharaoh, now facing a desperate fight for his life, summoned up his courage, called upon his god Amun, and fought to save himself. Ramesses personally led several charges into the Hittite ranks together with his personal guard, some of the chariots from his Amun division and survivors from the routed division of Re.

The Hittites, who believed their enemies to be totally routed, had stopped to plunder the Egyptian camp and so became easy targets for Ramesses's counterattack. His action was successful in driving the looters back towards the Orontes River and away from the Egyptian camp, and in the ensuing pursuit, the heavier Hittite chariots were easily overtaken and dispatched by the lighter, faster Egyptian chariots.

Although he had suffered a significant reversal, Muwatalli II still commanded a large force of reserve chariotry and infantry, as well as the walls of the town. As the retreat reached the river, he ordered another thousand chariots to attack the Egyptians, the stiffening element being the high nobles who surrounded the king. As the Hittite forces approached the Egyptian camp again, the Ne'arin troop contingent from Amurru suddenly arrived, surprising the Hittites. Finally, the Ptah division arrived from the south, threatening the Hittite rear.

After six charges, the Hittite forces were almost surrounded, and the survivors were pinned against the Orontes. The remaining Hittite elements, which had not been overtaken in the withdrawal, were forced to abandon their chariots and attempt to swim across the river, according to Egyptian accounts hurriedly ("as fast as crocodiles swimming"), where many of them drowned.

There is no consensus about the outcome or what took place, with views ranging from an Egyptian victory to a draw, or, in the view of Iranian Egyptologist Mehdi Yarahmadi, an Egyptian defeat, with the Egyptian accounts being simply propaganda. The Hittite army was ultimately forced to retreat, but the Egyptians were unsuccessful in capturing Kadesh.

Aftermath

Logistically unable to support a long siege of the walled city of Kadesh, Ramesses gathered his troops and retreated south towards Damascus and ultimately back to Egypt. Once back in Egypt, Ramesses then proclaimed victory since he had routed his enemies, but he did not even attempt to capture Kadesh. In a personal sense, however, the Battle of Kadesh was a triumph for Ramesses since after blundering into a devastating Hittite chariot ambush, the young king had courageously rallied his scattered troops to fight on the battlefield and escaped death or capture. The new lighter faster two-man Egyptian chariots were able to pursue and take down the slower three-man Hittite chariots from behind as they overtook them.

Hittite records from Hattusa, however, tell of a very different conclusion to the greater campaign in which a chastened Ramesses was forced to depart from Kadesh in defeat. Modern historians conclude that the battle ended in a draw from a practical point of view but was a turning point for the Egyptians, who had developed new technologies and rearmed before pushing back against the years-long steady incursions by the Hittites.

The Hittite king, Muwatalli II, continued to campaign as far south as the Egyptian province of Upi (Apa), which he captured and placed under the control of his brother Hattusili, the future Hattusili III. Egypt's sphere of influence in Asia was now restricted to Canaan. Even that was threatened for a time by revolts among Egypt's vassal states in the Levant, and Ramesses was compelled to embark on a series of campaigns in Canaan to uphold his authority there before he could initiate further assaults against the Hittite Empire.

In the eighth and ninth years of his reign, Ramesses extended his military successes. This time, he proved more successful against his Hittite foes by successfully capturing the cities of Dapur and Tunip, where no Egyptian soldier had been seen since under Thutmose III, almost 120 years earlier.

Ramesses's victory proved to be ephemeral, however. The thin strip of territory pinched between Amurru and Kadesh did not make for a stable possession. Within a year, it had returned to the Hittite fold, which meant that Ramesses had to march against Dapur once more in his tenth year. His second success was just as meaningless as his first since neither Egypt nor Hatti could decisively defeat the other in battle.

An official peace treaty with Hattusili III, the new king of the Hittites some 15 years after the Battle of Kadesh, and in the 21st year of Ramesses II's reign (1258 BC in conventional chronology), finally concluded running borderlands conflicts. The treaty was inscribed on a silver tablet, of which a clay copy survived in the Hittite capital of Hattusa, now in Turkey, and is on display at the Istanbul Archaeology Museum. An enlarged replica of the agreement hangs on a wall at the headquarters of the United Nations, as the earliest international peace treaty known to historians. Its text, in the Hittite version, appears in the links below. An Egyptian version survives on a papyrus.

Documentation

There is more evidence in the form of texts and wall reliefs for this battle than for any other in the Ancient Near East, but almost all of it is from an Egyptian perspective. Indeed, the first scholarly report on the battle, by James Henry Breasted in 1903, praised the sources that allowed the reconstruction of the battle with certainty. However, some historians argue that the battle was a draw at best and that Egyptian influence over Amurru and Qadesh seems to have been lost forever.

The main source of information is in the Egyptian record of the battle for which a general level of accuracy is assumed, despite factual errors and propaganda. The bombastic nature of Ramesses's version has long been recognized. The Egyptian version of the battle is recorded in two primary forms, known as the Poem and the Bulletin. The Poem has been questioned as actual verse, as opposed to a prose account similar to that recorded by other pharaohs. Likewise, the Bulletin is itself simply a lengthy caption accompanying the reliefs. The inscriptions are repeated multiple times (seven for the Bulletin and eight for the Poem, in temples in Abydos, Temple of Luxor, Karnak, Abu Simbel and the Ramesseum).

In addition to these lengthy presentations, there are also numerous small captions used to point out various elements of the battle. Besides the inscriptions, there are textual occurrences preserved in Papyrus Raifet and Papyrus Sallier III,<ref>Breasted, James Henry, Ancient Records of Egypt: Historical Documents" (1906) p. 58.</ref> and a rendering of these same events in a letter from Ramesses to Hattusili III written in response to a scoffing complaint by Hattusili about the pharaoh's victorious depiction of the battle.

Hittite references to the battle, including the above letter, have been found at Hattusa, but no annals have been discovered that might describe it as part of a campaign. Instead, there are various references made to it in the context of other events. That is especially true of Hattusili III for whom the battle marked an important milestone in his career.

Hittite allies
Sources: Goetze, A., "The Hittites and Syria (1300–1200 B.C.)", in Cambridge Ancient History (1975) p. 253; Gardiner, Alan, The Kadesh Inscriptions of Ramesses II (1975) pp. 57ff.; Breasted, James Henry, Ancient Records of Egypt; Historical Records (1906) pp. 125ff.; Lichtheim, Miriam, Ancient Egyptian Literature, Vol. 2: The New Kingdom (1978), pp. 57ff.

In addition to these allies, the Hittite king also hired the services of some of the local Shasu tribes.

Hittite fallen
Source: Gardiner, Alan, The Kadesh Inscriptions of Ramesses II'' (1975) pp. 39–41.

See also

 Chariotry in ancient Egypt
 Egyptian–Hittite peace treaty
 Battle of Megiddo

References

Further reading
 
  includes information of the clash of the Egyptians and Hittites including the battle of Kadesh and maps of the regions controlled by the peoples named in the accounts.

External links

 The Eternal treaty from the Hittite perspective (thebritishmuseum.ac.uk)
 André Dollinger (reshafim.org.il):
 End of Egyptian–Hittite hostilities
 The peace treaty between Ramses II and Hattusili III
 The Battle of Kadesh in the context of Hittite history (hittites.info)
 Battle of Kadesh (historynet.com)

13th century BC
Battles involving ancient Egypt
Battles involving the Hittite Empire
Battles involving the Canaanites
Canaan
Battle
2nd-millennium BC conflicts
Abu Simbel